Ersan Dogu (born 20 April 1972) is a Turkish former professional footballer who played as a striker.

References

1972 births
Living people
Association football forwards
Turkish footballers
SV Werder Bremen players
SV Werder Bremen II players
Galatasaray S.K. footballers
VfB Oldenburg players
FC Oberneuland players
Bremer SV players
Bundesliga players